The 2011 Indiana vs. Kentucky men's basketball game was a college basketball game between the Hoosiers of Indiana University Bloomington and Wildcats of the University of Kentucky who was ranked number 1 in the nation. A rivalry game between the two schools, this game was held at Assembly Hall on Indiana's campus. In an upset victory that was considered a turning point for the Hoosiers program, unranked Indiana defeated top-ranked Kentucky 73–72 on a buzzer-beating three-pointer by Christian Watford, which was nicknamed the "Watshot".

Background

Indiana

Indiana entered this game with an 8–0 record and had earned 4 points in the most recent AP Poll (released on December 5), enough for 39th place of all schools receiving votes. In the Coaches Poll released the same day, Indiana earned 23 points, sufficient for 31st place in the poll. In his fourth season at Indiana, head coach Tom Crean was hired in April 2008 after previous head coach Kelvin Sampson resigned due to recruiting violations. Crean's first season in 2008–09 was the worst in school history, ending with a 6–25 record. Indiana improved to 10–21 in the 2009–10 season, and then to 12–20 in 2010–11.

Kentucky

Like Indiana, Kentucky entered this game with an 8–0 record. Kentucky was also ranked #1 in the AP and Coaches Polls. Head coach John Calipari was in his third season at Kentucky, having led Kentucky to the 2010 Elite Eight and 2011 Final Four in the previous two NCAA Tournaments. Kentucky also had a star-studded group of freshmen on its roster, consisting of four former 5-star recruits in Anthony Davis, Michael Kidd-Gilchrist, Marquis Teague, and Kyle Wiltjer.

Rivalry

Indiana and Kentucky have a basketball rivalry dating back to 1924. The rivalry series had been played annually since the 1969–70 season on a home-and-home basis. Kentucky had won the past three games in this series. For the 2011 game, students lined up as early as 10 hours before tipoff for tickets.

Game summary
The game had a total of 13 lead changes, and neither team could extend its lead by much throughout the game. Kentucky's largest lead was 6 with 8:17 to go in the first half; Indiana's largest lead was 10, at 63–53 with 15:56 left in the second half. Neither team could get ahead. However, Kentucky rallied to take a 69-68 lead with 2 minutes to play, and the lead would change three more times. Indiana's Christian Watford made a layup to put Indiana up 70–69 with 1:07 left, and then Kentucky's Marquis Teague followed that up with his own layup to give Kentucky a 71–70 lead.

After Watford missed a jumper with 30 seconds left, Indiana's Cody Zeller fouled Kentucky's Anthony Davis with 19 seconds remaining. With Kentucky only in the bonus (it was Indiana's ninth 2nd-half foul), Davis missed the front end of the one-and-one free throw, and Indiana's Victor Oladipo rebounded. After an Indiana timeout, Kentucky's Doron Lamb stole the ball from Oladipo and was fouled with 5.6 seconds left. This foul put Kentucky in the double bonus; Lamb missed his first free throw attempt, but made the second to put Kentucky up 72–70. Watford inbounded the ball to Verdell Jones III, who drove the ball by a screen set by Zeller at half-court. Jones then passed the ball to Watford, who made a Darius Miller-contested three-pointer at the buzzer to win the game for Indiana, 73–72. Players, students, and fans immediately stormed the court.

Aftermath

Impact on Indiana basketball

With this win, Indiana beat a #1 ranked team for the first time since beating Duke in the Sweet 16 round of the 2002 NCAA Tournament. It was also Indiana's first win over a #1 team at Assembly Hall since beating Michigan State on January 7, 2001.

Watford's game-winning, buzzer-beating shot in this game has been compared to Keith Smart's game-winner that sealed Indiana's 1987 NCAA title. Josh Sanburn wrote for Time.com:

Sanburn also characterized Watford's game-winner and the court-storming that followed as "a collective and spontaneous surge of relief" following the seasons after the firing of Bob Knight.

College Magazine also credited this game as a reason behind a "resurgence" of Indiana Hoosiers basketball.

Rematch in 2012 NCAA Tournament
Indiana and Kentucky met again in the Sweet 16 round of the 2012 NCAA Tournament on March 23 in Atlanta. Kentucky won 102–90 and would eventually win their eighth NCAA championship.

Future of series
This game remains the final regular season men's basketball matchup between Indiana and Kentucky, after Crean and Calipari could not reach an agreement on game venues. Indiana wanted to continue playing the series on a home-and-home basis rotating between the two schools' campuses, while Kentucky wanted to play on a neutral court at Lucas Oil Stadium in Indianapolis. The rivalry resumed after Calipari's announcement.

Broadcasting
The game was televised nationally on ESPN and carried on radio by both schools' radio networks, the Indiana Hoosier Sports Network and UK Sports Network. Nielsen ratings ranked this game the 23rd most-watched program of the week ending December 13, 2011, with  3.59 million viewers and a share of 2.3. SportsBusiness Daily ranked this game the third most-watched regular season college basketball game on cable for the 2011–12 season.

References

External links
Box score
ESPN video of game-winning shot
Video of game-winning shot and reaction with audio from Indiana Hoosiers radio broadcast

2011–12 Big Ten Conference men's basketball season
2011–12 Southeastern Conference men's basketball season
College basketball games in the United States
Indiana Hoosiers men's basketball
Kentucky Wildcats men's basketball
Indiana vs. Kentucky men's basketball game
Indiana vs. Kentucky men's basketball game